Ioakeim Vasiliadis (born 24 January 1965) is a Greek wrestler. He competed in the men's freestyle 74 kg at the 1992 Summer Olympics.

References

1965 births
Living people
Greek male sport wrestlers
Olympic wrestlers of Greece
Wrestlers at the 1992 Summer Olympics
Place of birth missing (living people)
Soviet people of Greek descent
20th-century Greek people